Jane Vallebo Thorngaard Heitmann (born 5 November 1968 in Copenhagen) is a Danish politician, who is a member of the Folketing for the Venstre political party. She was elected into parliament at the 2011 Danish general election.

Political career
Heitmann was in the municipal council of Faaborg Municipality from 2006 and until 2007 where it was merged with the municipalities of Broby, Ringe, Ryslinge and Årslev to form the new Faaborg-Midtfyn Municipality. She sat in the municipal council in this new municipality from its foundation in 2007 and until 2017, where local political Ole Pedersen took over her seat.

Heitmann was first elected into the Folketing at the 2011 election, where she received 4,196 votes. She was reelected in 2015 with 4,677 votes and in 2019 with 4,420	votes.

External links 
 Biography on the website of the Danish Parliament (Folketinget)

References 

Living people
1968 births
Politicians from Copenhagen
Danish municipal councillors
Venstre (Denmark) politicians
Women members of the Folketing
Members of the Folketing 2011–2015
Members of the Folketing 2015–2019
Members of the Folketing 2019–2022
21st-century Danish women politicians